Englewood High School (EHS) is a public high school in Jacksonville, Florida, United States. It is part of the Duval County Public Schools district.

Notable alumni 
 Ryan Freel, MLB player
 Brett Myers, MLB player
 Daniel Murphy, former MLB baseball player and the 2015 NLCS MVP with the New York Mets
 Rashean Mathis, NFL player
 Willie Smith, NFL player
 Butch Trucks, drummer
 Ray Nettles, CFL player
 Barbara Blank, model, actress, reality television personality, and professional wrestler
 RJ Cyler, actor

References

External links 
 

Duval County Public Schools
High schools in Jacksonville, Florida
Public high schools in Florida